Sourribes is a commune in the Alpes-de-Haute-Provence department in southeastern France.

Population

Geography
The town is crossed by the Vançon. The village is situated 420 m above sea level. Beaudu caves.

History
Roman ruins are found to Beaudu. Several discoveries of Roman coins have been held on the common [2].

The town appears for the first time in the charters in 739.

An abbey of Benedictine nuns was founded before 1160, and remained there until 1464 and its merger with Abbey St. Clare of Sisteron. The abbey is lord of.

The common Beaudu it annexed in 1909. The medieval community had 24 fires in the enumeration of 1315, but was deserted in 1471. In 1765, she had 68 people.

A scrub is created in 1943 it was partly made up of peasants who continued to have a normal life, but who were mobilized in two hours.

Toponymy
The village's name as it appears the first time in 739 (Subtusripas), refers to its position at the foot of a rock.

See also
Communes of the Alpes-de-Haute-Provence department

References

Communes of Alpes-de-Haute-Provence
Alpes-de-Haute-Provence communes articles needing translation from French Wikipedia